The Xi'an–Yan'an high-speed railway or Xiyan HSR is a high-speed railway line currently under construction in Shaanxi, China. It is expected to reduce the journey time between Yan'an and Xi'an from 2.5 hours to approximately one hour.

The railway is expected to open in 2025. It will parallel the existing Xi'an–Yan'an railway, but take a more direct route.

History

Construction of the  Tongchuan to Yan'an section started construction in April 2021. The route of the remaining  from Xi'an to Tongchuan was confirmed in August 2022. Construction of Xi'an to Tongchuan section started in November 2022.

Stations

References

High-speed railway lines in China
High-speed railway lines under construction